Yonglongsha, sometimes translated as the Yonglong Shoal or Yonglong Sands, was a former island in the north channel of the Yangtze River to the north of Chongming in eastern China. It was also known as Yongfengsha and Hefengsha.

History
Yonglongsha first appeared in the 42nd year of Kangxi (1703) but was impermanent. It emerged most recently in 1937. Eroding on the south and east while growing to the north and west, it migrated from the center of the Yangtze's northern channel towards Chongming. Its shores were stabilized and expanded by workers from Haimen and Qidong, two county-level cities of Nantong in Jiangsu, in the late 1960s. The reclaimed areas were administered at first as farmsteads. By 1968, there were 1,800 hectares under cultivation, growing corn and fava beans. Another 3000 workers sent by Haimen over the next year reclaimed another  by 1970. The same year, 200 households became the island's first permanent inhabitants. Qidong's area of the island began to merge with Chongming in 1972, followed by Haimen's three years later. Now its former area continues to be administered as Jiangsu's pene-enclave townships of Haiyong and Qilong rather than as part of Shanghai's Chongming County. Areas of the former channel between the two islands form the North Heng Irrigation Canal   p Běi Héng Yǐnhé), a stretch of the canal which runs in a partial ring around Chongming Island.

A separate area of present-day Qilong derives from its absorption of a second shoal, Xinglongsha   p Xīnglóngshā), which likewise formed in the middle of the Yangtze's channel and then migrated over time towards Chongming.

Infrastructure
During its existence, the island had ferry service to Haimen's Lingdian Harbor (t , s , p Língdiāngǎng) and Qidong's Sanhe Harbor (Sānhégǎng). Its communities are now connected to Chongming's highway and ferry network, including the Chongqi Bridge to Qidong.

See also
 Chongming Island
 Haiyong & Qilong
 Islands of Shanghai

References

External links
  at Hudong Baike 

Former islands of China
Islands of Jiangsu
Nantong